Events in the year 2007 in Eritrea.

Incumbents 

 President: Isaias Afewerki

Events 

 30 July – United Nations Security Council Resolution 1767, which extended the U.N. mandate in the country and Ethiopia, was unanimously adopted.

Deaths

References 

 
2000s in Eritrea
Years of the 21st century in Eritrea
Eritrea
Eritrea